WRLV-FM (106.5 FM) is a radio station broadcasting a country music format. Established in 1989, the station is licensed to serve Salyersville, Kentucky, United States.  The station is owned by Morgan County Industries, Inc.

References

External links

RLV-FM
Country radio stations in the United States
Radio stations established in 1990
1990 establishments in Kentucky
Salyersville, Kentucky